Oscar Rabin (26 April 1899 – 20 June 1958) was a Latvian-born English bandleader and musician. He was the musical director of  his own big band.

Rabin was born in Riga to a family of Jewish origin, and came to London, England as a child. A blind music teacher and violinist taught Rabin music in exchange for him acting as a guide. At 15 he became a professional musician, he then worked in theatre orchestras and attended the Guildhall School of Music.

His career was interrupted by service in the First World War, then in 1922 he formed an ensemble with Harry Davis. He formed the Oscar Rabin Band (see main article) but was not the leader on stage as he preferred to play the bass saxophone.

He died in London aged 59. His granddaughter, Rachel Rabin, is also a musician.

References

External links

1899 births
1958 deaths
20th-century British conductors (music)
20th-century English musicians
Alumni of the Guildhall School of Music and Drama
English bandleaders
Dance band bandleaders
Latvian Jews
Latvian emigrants to the United Kingdom